Arthur Sleight "Rube" DeGroff  (September 2, 1879 – December 17, 1955) was a professional baseball outfielder from 1903 to 1916. He played two seasons in Major League Baseball for the St. Louis Cardinals. DeGroff was 5 feet, 11 inches tall and weighed 190 pounds.

Career
DeGroff was born in Hyde Park, New York, in 1879. He started his professional baseball career in 1903 with the Hudson River League's Kingston Colonials. In 1905, he joined the New York State League's Troy Trojans and had a batting average of .315. DeGroff made his major league debut with the St. Louis Cardinals in September of that year, and in 15 games, he batted .250. He also appeared in one game for the Cardinals in 1906 before going back to the Trojans. That was the last time he played in the majors.

In 1906 and 1907, DeGroff batted .314 for Troy. He led the league in hits during both of those seasons. DeGroff then went to the Eastern League for one year, batted .255, and returned to the New York State League in 1909 where he led all players with 10 home runs.

DeGroff hit under .250 in 1910 and 1911. Upon joining the New England League's Lowell Grays in 1912, however, he had one of his best years at the plate. He batted .348, setting his career-high in that category, and led the league in hits, doubles, triples, home runs, slugging percentage, and total bases. In 1913, his batting average went down to .299, but he paced the circuit in home runs again.

DeGroff played one more season for Lowell and then two in the New York State League before his professional baseball career ended. He later managed a team in Hyde Park called the Robin Hoods. In 1936, US president Franklin D. Roosevelt (who was also born in Hyde Park) attended a Robin Hoods game and told the crowd that he and DeGroff used to play on the same baseball team.

DeGroff died in Poughkeepsie, New York, in 1955.

References

External links

1879 births
1955 deaths
Major League Baseball outfielders
St. Louis Cardinals players
Kingston Colonials players
Rochester Bronchos players
Troy Trojans (minor league) players
Jersey City Skeeters players
Wilkes-Barre Barons (baseball) players
Milwaukee Brewers (minor league) players
Zanesville Potters players
Lowell Grays players
Baseball players from New York (state)
People from Hyde Park, New York
Road incident deaths in New York (state)